Vendetta is a 2015 American vigilante action film directed by the Soska sisters starring Dean Cain, Paul Wight (the Big Show), and Michael Eklund. It is the first film in the "Action Six-Pack" series. The film was released in a limited release and through video on demand on June 12, 2015.

Plot

When his pregnant wife is violently killed by a criminal whom he put away, Mason, a hard-nosed detective, deliberately gets arrested to get revenge. While inside, Mason discovers a new criminal enterprise that those behind it would kill to protect.

Cast
Dean Cain as Mason Danvers
Michael Eklund as Warden Snyder
Kyra Zagorsky as Jocelyn Danvers
Ben Hollingsworth as Joel Gainer
Paul Wight as Victor Abbot
Aleks Paunovic as Griffin
Adrian Holmes as Drexel
Jonathan Walker as Lester
Juan Riedinger as Booker
Uros Certic as Marco
Matthew MacCaull as Ben
Paul Anthony as Daddy Mak

Production
Vendetta was filmed in Coquitlam, British Columbia, Canada.

Vendetta was part of a six-film deal WWE Studios made with Lionsgate that will be releasing WWE's Action Six-Pack, a series of unconnected action films.

Release
Vendetta received a limited theatrical release. It was released to theaters and video on demand on June 12, 2015.

Reception
The Hollywood Reporter described the film as "the sort of B-movie violent actioner that makes you feel your testosterone level rising as you watch it", while the "screenplay offers no surprises, mainly serving as a springboard for the endless series of fight scenes in which Cain demonstrates that he's become a serious movie badass." The Soska sisters "prove themselves quite proficient at staging the brutal skirmishes which inevitably lead to a climatic prison riot."

References

External links
 

2015 films
2010s English-language films
WWE Studios films
Films directed by the Soska sisters
Films scored by the Newton Brothers
American action films
Lionsgate films
2010s American films